Sati, also known as Dakshayani (Sanskrit: दाक्षायणी, IAST: Dākṣāyaṇī, lit. 'daughter of Daksha'), is the Hindu goddess of marital felicity and longevity, and is worshipped as an aspect of the mother goddess Shakti. Sati was the first wife of Shiva, the other being Parvati, who was Sati's reincarnation after her death.

The earliest mentions of Sati are found in the time of the Ramayana and the Mahabharata, but details of her story appear in the Puranas. Legends describe Sati as the favourite child of Daksha, who marries Shiva against her father's wishes. After Daksha humiliates her and her husband, Sati kills herself in the yajna (Fire-Sacrifice) to protest against him, and uphold the honour of her husband. In Hinduism, both Sati and Parvati, successively play the role of bringing Shiva away from ascetic isolation into creative participation with the world.

Sati's story plays an important part in shaping the traditions of two of the most prominent sects of Hinduism  Shaivism and Shaktism. It is believed that after Sati's death, Shiva came and picked up her deep sacred mortal self remains and roam around the whole world and then,  parts of Sati's mortal remains fell on fifty-one places and formed the Shakti Peethas.

Etymology
The word "Satī" means "truthful", "virtuous" or "noble". The word is derived from the "Satya" which means "truth". 

She is known by various patronymics, though these names can be used for any of the daughters of Daksha. Some of these names include Dakshayani, Dakshakanya and Dakshja.

History and textual background
According to scholars William J. Winkins and David R. Kinsley, the Vedic scriptures (2nd millennium BCE) do not mention Sati-Parvati but hint to two goddesses associated with Rudra  Rudrani and Ambika. In the Kena Upanishad, a goddess called Uma-Hemavati appears as a mediator between the gods  and the Supreme Brahman. Both the archeological and the textual sources indicate that the first major appearances of Sati-Parvati were during the period of the Ramayana and the Mahabharata (1st millennium BCE).

The Mahabharata mentions the destruction of Daksha yajna, the birth of Kartikeya, defeat the Asura Taraka as well as some plays between Shiva and Uma (Parvati). Scholars believe that by the time of the Puranas (c. 4th - 13th century), legends of Sati and Parvati rose to prominence and these were adapted by Kalidasa in his epic poem Kumarasambhavam (c. 5th - 6th century). Some of the Puranas which narrate Sati's story are the Vayu Purana, the Skanda Purana, the Bhagavata Purana, the Kurma Purana, the Padma Purana, the Linga Purana, the Shiva Purana, and the Matsya Purana.

Legends

Birth and early life
Prajapati Daksha was the son of the creator god Brahma. He married Prasuti, daughter of Manu and Shatarupa, and had many daughters. Sati was the youngest and favourite daughter of Daksha. Texts like the Shiva Purana, Matsya Purana and Kalika Purana mention Asikni as the mother of Sati. According to the Shakta (goddess-oriented) texts including Devi Bhagavata and the Mahabhagavata Purana, Brahma advised Daksha to meditate upon the Great goddess and convince her to take an avatar as their daughter (Sati). The goddess agreed but warned that if he mistreated her, she will abandon her body.

Even as a child, Sati adored the tales of Shiva and grew up an ardent devotee. As she grew to womanhood, the idea of marrying anyone else, as intended by her father, became unfair to her. It is believed that Brahma intended to get Sati married to Shiva and bring him into worldly affairs.

Marriage

Sati is described to be very beautiful but the legends emphasize her penance and devotion, which won the heart of the ascetic Shiva. According to the legend, Sati left the luxuries of her father's palace and retired to a forest to devote herself to austerities of a hermetic life and the worship of Shiva. She was often tested by Shiva or his attendants. Finally, Shiva acceded to her wishes and consented to marry. Despite Daksha's unwillingness, the wedding was held in due course with Brahma serving as the priest. Sati moved with Shiva in Kailash. Tension between Shiva and Daksha further arises when Daksha starts to dislike Shiva because of Shiva's odd appearance and behaviour. 

According to the Mahabhagvata Purana, Daksha arranged Sati's Swayamvar (self-choice ceremony), where all except Shiva were invited. When Sati did not find Shiva, she threw a garland in the air to choose her husband. Shiva manifested there and it fell on him, thus they were married. In the 18th century Svathani Katha, when Shiva asked Sati's hand in marriage, Daksha refused, claiming him unsuitable. Vishnu aided Shiva by disguising him as a sanyasi and had him marry her. While many versions mention Daksha's objections to the marriage, the Shiva Purana does not mention any harsh opposition, though he starts to develop a deep hatred after the wedding.

Daksha yajna and self-immolation

The most prominent legend associated with Sati is her self-immolation to protest against her father. The first text to mention Daksha Yajna is the Taittiriya Samhita and it later appears in the Ramayana and the Mahabharata. The narrative of Sati's self immolation appears in the Puranas, Tantra literature, and in Kalidasa's lyrical Kumarasambhava.

According to the most popular narrative, Daksha organized a yajna (sacrifice) to which all the deities, except Sati and Shiva, were invited. Wanting to visit her relatives, Sati sought to rationalize this omission and reasoned that as family, such formality was unnecessary. Shiva tried to stop her as he knew that Daksha would humiliate her, but when she was not convinced, he sent her with his gana attendants. Sati was received by her mother and her sisters, but Daksha was furious by her uninvited arrival and humiliated her and mocked Shiva. Wanting to break all ties with her father and uphold the honour of her husband, Sati self-immolated.

Deeply hurt by the death of his wife, Shiva performed the destructive Tandava dance. He created two ferocious deities  Virabhadra and Bhadrakali, who wreaked mayhem at the sacrificial place. Nearly all those present were felled overnight; Daksha was decapitated by Virabhadra. After that night, Shiva, who is considered the all-forgiving, restored the slain to life and granted them his blessings. Daksha was restored both to life and to kingship. His severed head was substituted with that of a goat.

There are varying accounts of this event. Some texts suggest that before Sati's death, Shakti promised that she will be reborn to a father who merits her respect and remarry Shiva. The Devi-Bhagavata Purana adds that after Sati's marriage, Daksha polluted a sacred flower garland. As a result, he was cursed to hate his beloved daughter. At the sacrificial place, Daksha discarded Sati's gifts and humiliated her, she used her cosmic powers and burnt her body. The Mahabhagavata Purana presents Sati as a fierce warrior. When Shiva prevented Sati from visiting the event, she transformed into the ten fearsome Mahavidya goddesses led by Kali, and surrounded him from the ten cardinal directions. Seeing his wife's powers, Shiva allowed her. Sati, transformed as Kali, went to the sacrifice and split herself into two entities  one real but invisible and another just Chhaya (shadow or clone). Chhaya Sati destroyed the sacred event by jumping into the sacrificial fire, while the "real" Sati is reborn as Parvati. The Brihaddharma Purana (c. 13th century) narrates the creation of the Mahavidyas but there is no mention of Sati splitting into two. She retains her calming nature after Shiva allowed her. The most drastic change in this text is the absence of the self-immolation of Sati. Instead, the text mentions that she cursed her father and quit her body in a Himalayan cave. The Kalika Purana does not mention Sati going to the event, instead it is found that Sati left her body using a yogic process, after her niece, Vijaya informed her about the yajna.

Formation of the Shakti Peethas

Another important legend associated with Sati is the formation of the Shakti Peethas. Shakti Peethas are shrines of the Mother Goddess, believed to have enshrined with the presence of Shakti due to the falling of body parts of the corpse of Sati. It is believed that an enraged Shiva performed the Tandava dance with Sati's charred body, which led her body to come apart and the pieces fell at different places on earth. In a more detailed narration found in some texts, Shiva, crazed with grief, roamed with Sati's corpse throughout the universe, causing universal imbalance. The divinities called upon the god Vishnu to restore Shiva to normalcy and calm. Vishnu used his Sudarshana Chakra (discus weapon) to dismember Sati's cadaver, following which Shiva regained his equanimity.

The legend ends with Sati's body being dismembered into many pieces which fell on earth at various places. Several different listings of these holy places, known as Shakti Peethas,'' are available; some of these places have become major centres of pilgrimage as they are held by the Goddess-oriented Shakta sect to be particularly holy. Besides main Shakti Peethas, some small peethas like Bindudham came into existence which are due to Sati's fallen blood drops.

Rebirth
A depressed Shiva returned to his ascetic world while Sati was reborn as Parvati, daughter of Himavat, king of the mountains and personification of the Himalayas, and his wife, Mena. Himavat appreciated Shiva ardently. Consequently, Parvati like Sati, won Shiva over by her penance and married him.

Legacy and worship

The legend of Daksha Yajna and Sati's self-immolation had immense significance in shaping the ancient Sanskrit literature and even had impact on the culture of India. It led to the development of the concept of Shakti Peethas and there by strengthening Shaktism. Many stories in Puranas took the Daksha yajna as the reason for its origin. It is an important incident in Shaivism resulting in the emergence of goddess Parvati in the place of Sati and making Shiva a grihastashrami (house holder) leading to the origin of Ganesha and Kartikeya.

Kottiyoor Vysakha Mahotsavam, a 27‑day yagnja ceremony, conducted in the serene hilly jungle location in North Kerala yearly commemorating the Daksha Yaga. It is believed that Sati Devi self immolated in this location and apparently this is the location of Daksha Yaga. The pooja and rituals were classified by Shri Sankaracharya.

Notes

Explanatory notes

Citations

Bibliography

External links

Forms of Parvati
Hindu goddesses
Consorts of Shiva
Daughters of Daksha
Marriage goddesses
Health goddesses
Death of deities